Andrew Mullen Gray (born 30 November 1955) is a Scottish football broadcaster and former player.

He played for Dundee United, Aston Villa, Wolverhampton Wanderers, Everton, Aston Villa, Notts County (on loan), West Bromwich Albion, Rangers and Cheltenham Town. He won 20 caps for Scotland.

Gray was the lead football pundit for Sky Sports (since it began its broadcast of the Premier League in August 1992) and was the channel's co-commentator for nearly 19 years (often working alongside Martin Tyler) until his dismissal in January 2011, following multiple allegations of sexism. Gray, along with former Sky Sports anchor Richard Keys, then signed for talkSPORT in February 2011. They both now work for beIN Sports in Doha, Qatar; since June 2013 they have been the main presenters of Premier League and UEFA Champions League match broadcasts within the Middle East and North Africa region.

Club career
Born in Glasgow and with a mother from the Isle of Lewis, Gray started his professional career as a player with Dundee United, where he scored 36 goals in 62 appearances He also played for Dundee United in the 1974 Scottish Cup Final finishing on the losing  side as Celtic ran out 3-0 winners.

In October 1975, at the age of 19, he moved south to Aston Villa (newly promoted to the First Division) for £110,000 and was joint winner of England's golden boot with Arsenal's Malcolm Macdonald in 1976–77. His 29 goals helped Villa to a fourth-place finish and victory in the League Cup, and earned him the PFA Young Player of the Year and PFA Players' Player of the Year awards, a double matched by Cristiano Ronaldo in 2009 and Gareth Bale in 2013. At the time he was the youngest player to earn the Players' Player of the Year award, and the first player to win more than one of the official three player of the year awards in the same season.

Gray moved to Villa's local rivals Wolverhampton Wanderers on 8th September 1979. His signing was announced to the fans and media prior to The Wolves kick off at home to Crystal Palace, as a pre match celebration at the Molineux for an English record transfer fee of £1.49m. After scoring the winning goal for Wolves in the 1980 League Cup final, he remained with the club through their relegation in 1982 (despite interest from Manchester United) and promotion a year later.

Gray moved to Everton in November 1983 for £250,000. He spent two seasons with the Merseyside club, winning the FA Cup in May 1984. Gray scored in the final against Watford in controversial fashion by heading the ball out of the Watford's goalkeeper's hands. A year later, he won the League Championship and European Cup Winners' Cup, also scoring in the final of the latter. He also reached another FA Cup final, but this time he was on the losing side as Everton were defeated by Manchester United. Then came the arrival of England striker Gary Lineker from Leicester City in the 1985 close season. Despite angry petitions from Everton fans wanting to keep Gray at Goodison Park, he left the club on 10 July 1985, returning to Aston Villa in a £150,000 deal.

Despite starting the decade on a high as league champions in 1981 and European Cup winners in 1982, Villa had now declined to mid table mediocrity and the return of Gray was unable to turn things around as his arrival at Everton had done. He scored five goals from 35 league games in 1985–86 as Villa narrowly avoided relegation to the Second Division, and the following season he didn't score in 19 league games as Villa fell into the Second Division. He began the 1987–88 season still with Villa, but was transferred to their local rivals West Bromwich Albion in September 1987 having not featured in a first team game for Villa that season. His spell at Albion lasted less than a year, and was uneventful as they narrowly avoided relegation from the Second Division.

In mid-1988, he joined Rangers. He spent one season at Ibrox, helping them win the Scottish Premier Division title – the first of nine successive titles they would win. He dropped into non-league football with Football Conference club Cheltenham Town in summer 1989, and scored his first goal for the club in a 2–0 home win over Chorley on 21 October 1989, before retiring in 1990.

International career
Gray's Player of the Year accolades in England were surprisingly not enough to convince Scotland manager Ally MacLeod to select him for the 1978 World Cup squad. Gray won 20 caps for Scotland, scoring 7 goals for his country. He also won four caps at Under-23 level and played at schoolboy level. His full international debut came on 17 December 1975 in a 1–1 draw with Romania. He was not selected for any of Scotland's World Cup squads during his playing days. His final senior appearance for Scotland came on 28 May 1985 in a 1–0 win over Iceland in a 1986 World Cup qualifier. This had been his first cap for two years, despite him scoring twice in his penultimate appearance for the national side on 19 June 1983 in a 2–0 friendly win over Canada, and him excelling on the club level for Everton after his transfer to the Merseyside club later in 1983.

Coaching
After retiring as a player, Gray entered coaching as an assistant to Ron Atkinson at Aston Villa before focusing full-time on his television work.

Commentary career
After leaving coaching, Gray became a football commentator, pundit, and analyst on Sky Sports, serving as a Scottish facet of its Premier League coverage since its inception in 1992, most notably alongside studio anchor Richard Keys and lead match commentators Martin Tyler and Ian Darke. In addition, he reported for Sky from Euro 2004 in Portugal, although Sky did not have broadcast rights for the games. He commentated for BBC Radio 5 Live in the 2002 World Cup and for ESPN in Euro 2008. Gray also provides betting tips for Betfair, and also provided commentary for the EA Sports's FIFA of video games along with Clive Tyldesley and Martin Tyler from FIFA 06 to FIFA 11, until being replaced in FIFA 12 by Sky Sports pundit Alan Smith.

In January 2011, Gray was forced to apologise for comments he made about a female assistant referee, Sian Massey, in a Premier League match.  Believing that his microphone was switched off, Gray commented to co-host Richard Keys: "Can you believe that? A female linesman. Women don't know the offside rule." Keys replied: "Course they don't." The comments were criticised by Sky Sports, football fans and the Football Association. On 24 January it was announced that both Gray and Keys would be banned for one game. On 25 January 2011, it was announced his contract was being terminated for unacceptable behaviour. Barney Francis, Sky Sports' managing director, said Gray was dismissed "in response to new evidence of unacceptable and offensive behaviour in an off-air incident that took place in December 2010".  The Daily Telegraph suggested that the Sky statement refers directly to a clip of Gray and Charlotte Jackson in rehearsals for the Sky Sports Christmas Special. While Jackson is attaching a microphone pack, Gray lifts his belt and says: "Charlotte, can you tuck this down here for me?"

In late 2011 Keys and Gray appeared in Smash It!, a show designed for the corporate hospitality circuit. The title of the show came from sexual remarks that Keys had made to Jamie Redknapp. An earlier theatre tour in 2011 had to be cancelled due to poor ticket sales. 
He currently presents a Friday evening Talk Sport show with sidekick Richard Keys.

Since June 2013, both Andy Gray alongside Richard Keys have been presenting the Premier League football coverage on beIN Sports.

Gray's former teammate at Everton, Peter Reid, suggested that Gray's dismissal may have been connected to a legal battle between Gray and the former title News of the World (both it and Sky were owned by News Corporation at the time) over phone-tapping.

On 25 January 2014, Gray returned to commentating on British television on BT Sport for an FA Cup match between Stevenage and Everton. His appearance occurred three years to the day since his dismissal by Sky. He then commentated alongside Darren Fletcher for the Arsenal v Liverpool match in the next round.

Personal life
Gray has been married to Rachel Lewis, a former model who was previously married to his long-time friend and agent Michael Lewis, since 10 February 2012. Gray was previously married to Vanessa Taylor and Jacqueline Cherry, and also had relationships with Sara Matthews and Janet Trigg.  Gray has five children.

Career statistics

International appearances

International goals
(NB scores and results list Scotland's goal tally first)

Honours
Aston Villa
League Cup: 1976–77

Wolverhampton Wanderers
League Cup: 1979–80

Everton
Football League Division One: 1984–85
FA Cup: 1983–84
FA Charity Shield: 1984
European Cup Winners' Cup: 1984–85

Rangers
Scottish Premier Division: 1988–89

References

External links

 International stats at Londonhearts.com
 

1955 births
Association football forwards
Aston Villa F.C. non-playing staff
Aston Villa F.C. players
Cheltenham Town F.C. players
Dundee United F.C. players
Everton F.C. players
First Division/Premier League top scorers
Living people
Notts County F.C. players
Rangers F.C. players
Scotland international footballers
Scotland under-23 international footballers
Scottish association football commentators
Scottish Football League players
Scottish footballers
Footballers from Glasgow
English Football League players
West Bromwich Albion F.C. players
Wolverhampton Wanderers F.C. players
Scottish league football top scorers
FA Cup Final players